José Mangual Jr. (born January 11, 1948, in Manhattan, New York City) is American Salsa percussionist of Puerto Rican Descent, singer and composer best known for his recordings with Willie Colón and Héctor Lavoe during the 1960s and 1970s salsa boom in New York.

Early career

He is the son of the legendary bongo musician, Jose Mangual, Sr., aka "Buyú" (1924–1998) and brother of Luis Mangual who is also a well-known Salsa percussionist. Both were born and raised in East Harlem. At age 15 Mangual began performing.

In 1968 Willie Colón hired Mangual to play bongos and sing background vocals for Hector Lavoe in Willie Colon's orchestra and in 1969 he played bongo and cowbell on Willie Colon and Hector Lavoe's Cosa Nuestra album which was the first album of Colon's to go gold. In 1973, Mangual co-authored the song "San Miguel.”

In 1974 he produced and recorded José Mangual* & Carlos "Patato" Valdez* – Understanding Latin Rhythms Vol. 1, which was an instructional album on the New Jersey based Latin Percussion label and percussion instrument manufacturer owned by Martin Cohen. Conceived as an instructional album for aspiring musicians, his father Jose Mangaul Sr. was on the bongos, Patato Valdéz on the conga, Bobby Rodríguez on bass with Manny Oquendo on the timbales.

In 1975 he played bongo on Hector Lavoe's album La Voz. When Hector Lavoe set off on his solo career, José Mangual Jr. became Lavoe's musical director. In 1977, Mangual started the record label, True Ventures Inc.. The first LP was A Tribute to Chano Pozo. The album features "Campanero" and "Cuero ‘Na Ma" – which has been covered by numerous artists. This was the first album where Mangual sang lead vocals. In 1977 he played Bongos, Maracas, Chorus Ensemble on Ruben Baldes and Willie Colon's LP Metiendo Mano and in 1978 on their LP Siembra.

Later career

In the early 1980s he signed with Velvet Records, and increased popularity in Latin America, Europe and Asian markets. Mangual's talent as a percussionist, singer, composer, and musical director lead him to record with artists including Ray Barretto, Rubén Blades, Herb Alpert, Dizzy Gillespie, David Byrne, Celia Cruz, Juan Luis Guerra, Ramon Orlando, Mario Bauza, The Fania All-Stars, Junior Gonzalez, Ismael Miranda, Louie Ramirez Mongo Santamaria and many others.

In 1995 he would be called upon again as precisionist for Ruben Baldes and Willie Colon's fifth and final album Tras La Tormenta.

From 1998 to 2012 Mangual formed and recorded with a group he founded called Son Boricua with Jimmy Sabater.  In 1998 he won the ACE Award for as best new Latin release for the LP Son Boricua along with Jimmy Sabater who sang lead vocal on the album.

In 2007 he recorded vocals and coro for the soundtrack for the movie El Cantante staring Marc Anthony and Jennifer Lopez.

Discography

 José Mangual* & Carlos "Patato" Valdez* – Understanding Latin Rhythms Vol. 1 (Latin Percussion 1974)
Tribute to Chano Pozo (True Ventures, Inc. 1977)
 Pa' Bailar y Gosar (Velvet 1979)
Mangual (aka Ritmo Y Sabor) (1980)
José Mangual Jr., Lita Branda, Melcochita : Con Sabor(1980)
"Time Will Tell" "Que Lo Diga El Tiempo..." (Campanero 1981)
Que Chévere (1982)
Soneros Con Clase (1982)
Lo Que Traigo es Salsa (1983)
Latin Rhythm & Moods (Tropical Budda Records, 1984)
Al Fin, Y Al Cabo (Combo Records, 1984)
 Dandole Color (Vedisco 1984)
 Son Boricua (1998)
Dancing with the Gods (Bailando Con Los Santos)(2003)
José Mangual Jr. – Dancing with the Gods (Bailando Con Los Santos) (Chola Musical Productions, 2012)

Filmography
El Cantante (Soundtrack) (2007)

See also
 Salsa
 Charanga (Cuba)
 Afro-Cuban jazz

References

External links
Discography at Discogs

1948 births
Living people
Fania Records artists
Latin jazz composers
People from Manhattan
American male singers
American musicians of Puerto Rican descent
American salsa musicians
Salsa musicians
Latin music record producers
Male jazz composers
21st-century American male musicians
Puerto Rican people of African descent
Conga players
Bongo players
20th-century Puerto Rican male singers
Puerto Rican male composers
Puerto Rican percussionists